Surat Diamond Bourse is a diamond trade centre, located at DREAM City, Khajod, Surat, Gujarat, India. The Project is accoladed with an IGBC ranking of Platinum Pre-Certified Green Building. It is India's second diamond trading hub and the world's largest corporate building, based at Surat, Gujarat, which is spread across 35.54 acres with availability of 66 lakh Sq.ft. built up area encompassing 4,000 offices for national & international traders. Every office is sighting onto the exquisitely designed landscape courts, which are designed on the concept of Panchtatva (5 Elements of Nature; Air, Water, Fire, Earth, Sky)

History 
Surat's diamond industry has been fulfilling the requirements of more than 90% of the well finished diamonds across the world. With a vision to overcome the setbacks of easy approachability and to boost profitability, Surat Diamond Bourse project was initiated in the year 2015. With growing commercialization and professionalism in the Diamond market, the industry giants came up with this concept of accommodating all the buyers, manufacturers and sellers under one single roof. This venture is at the heart of DREAM city project, envisioned by Prime Minister Narendra Modi. This will ensure the maximization of profits to all along with the greater quality and precision, and undoubtedly the ease of access to all the foreign traders. This 35.54 Acres wide gargantuan project, dwarfing diamond exchanges in Mumbai, Israel and Belgium, is expected to increase the business growth with around 90,000 Crore annually.Though COVID-19 hit the construction progress of SDB, the pace was increased, after lockdown was lifted and entire project got completed in 2022. To invoke the divine blessings into the campus, Ganesh Sthapana was done on 5 June 2022. It was celebrated with a Maha Aarti of Lord Ganesha, with 4200 lamps lit, in presence of 10,000 people including all committee members, office owners and their families.

Surat and Diamonds 
Surat city is well known for diamond industry, being the leader and dominating the world diamond market, for its precision work in cutting and polishing diamonds. Six decades ago, Surat diamond industry started with very rudimentary tools and techniques which now incorporates the most sophisticated and advanced technology for the process. Such advancement, has made this market, the producer of more than 90% of world's processed diamonds. Adding to the existing fame of Surat, is the DREAM (Diamond Research And Mercantile) city project, which is in planning to be developed in 2000 acres near Khajod (Surat), availing various residential and commercial spaces for business owners and employees in this industry.

Objectives of the project 

 To promote imports, exports and trading of Diamonds, Gems & Jewellery from India.
 To provide state-of-the-art infrastructure to the organizations engaged in manufacturing & trading of diamonds.
 To promote, advance, protect and develop trade, commerce and industry relating to Gems & Jewellery including cutting, polishing and processing.
 To establish and maintaining an International Trading Center in India to facilitate Diamond, Gems & Jewellery industry.
 To develop India as a modern and sophisticated Diamond, Gems & Jewellery market in the world.

Layout and facilities 

Surat Diamond Bourse is spread across 35.54 acres with availability of 66 lakh square feet, making it the World's Largest Corporate Building. This bourse comprises nine sky-high towers of 15 floors, accommodating 4200 offices ranging from 300 to 7500 sq.ft. There are 131 lifts, with a high speed of three meters per second, equipped with Destination Control system, to increase efficiency, reduce wastage time, enhance pace of the passenger movement, with lesser traffic or congestion. This will be a one-stop destination for international, national and local traders. This IGBC platinum rated green building provides amenities such as conference, multi-purpose halls, restaurants, banks, and retail shops along with efficient security plans. Along with this, to boost the economic activity and trade the dream city project will provide other facilities such as international banking and insurance facilities, a dedicated custom house accompanied by a national diamond research institute, an international convention center, international education facilities, five-star hotels and a dedicated custom house with high security surveillance system.

Green Building Concept 

Surat Diamond Bourse structure is based on architecture with ecological integrity. Accoladed with IGBC ranking of PLATINUM PRE-CERTIFIED GREEN BUILDING, SDB structure design is focused on energy efficiency and sensitive to the ecological sentiments. All the offices, at Surat Diamond Bourse are centrally air conditioned, using water cooled chiller system. Every office is sighting onto the exquisitely designed landscape courts, which are designed on the concept of Panchtatva (5 Elements of Nature; Air, Water, Fire, Earth, Sky) spanning almost 200 ft. wide and 300 ft. long. Sustainability is one of the most important aspects apart from the astonishing aesthetics & landscaping, contemplated in designing this facility. Aspects which are considered in the design and execution are

Microclimate – to maintain the temperature within the confined spaces,
Solar control – to reduce the direct heating due to sunlight,
Wind analysis – to evaluate and maximize natural ventilation, Orientation according to Sun and Wind direction,
Energy performance – for energy efficiency and WWR (wind to wall ratio).

The focus of the design is sustainable development of the building, enabling limited consumption of natural resources without sacrificing the overall facilitations of thermal, visual, or acoustic comfort of the occupants.

Dream City 
The immense potential of Surat Diamond industry has inspired the conceptualisation of The Diamond Research and Mercantile City (Dream City). With a core objective of improving the trading facilities of diamond industry (forward and backward integration), this mega project is formed in 683 hectares, on Sachin Magdalla National Highway close to the Surat international exhibition and convention centre (SIECC), and at a distance of three kilometers from airport.

With the multi-modal transport system planned, including the Surat Metro rail and BRTS, the commuting system is established for a smooth and comfort movement – in and out of the premises. There is a skywalk designed for passenger transfer from dream city metro station to diamond burst by BRTS service. The entire space will be bestowed with ample greenery, with the parks, gardens, and open spaces planned along with the dedicated cycle tracks, footpaths with elegant seating furniture, and smart street lights.

See also 
 Bharat Diamond Bourse

References

External links
 
 https://www.news4gujarati.com/corona-causes-loss-of-rs-40000-crore-to-surats-diamond-industry-news4-gujarati/

Diamond exchanges
Commodity exchanges in India
Economy of Surat
Diamond industry in India
2010 establishments in Gujarat
Indian companies established in 2010